In enzymology, a protein-histidine tele-kinase is an enzyme that catalyzes the chemical reaction

ATP + protein L-histidine  ADP + protein Nτ-phospho-L-histidine

Thus, the two substrates of this enzyme are ATP and protein L-histidine, whereas its two products are ADP and protein Ntau-phospho-L-histidine.

This enzyme belongs to the family of transferases, specifically those transferring a phosphate group to the sidechain of histidine residues in proteins (protein-histidine kinases). The systematic name of this enzyme class is ATP:protein-L-histidine Ntau-phosphotransferase. Other names in common use include ATP:protein-L-histidine N-tele-phosphotransferase, histidine kinase, histidine protein kinase, protein histidine kinase, protein kinase (histidine), and HK3.

References

 
 

EC 2.7.13
Enzymes of unknown structure